Grahame Mark Morris (born 13 March 1961) is a British Labour Party politician.  He was elected at the 2010 general election as the Member of Parliament (MP) for Easington, replacing Labour MP John Cummings, who decided to step down.

Morris briefly served on the Opposition frontbench of Jeremy Corbyn in 2016. He remains in the House of Commons as a backbencher.

Early life and career
Born in 1961, Morris was educated at Howletch Comprehensive School (now East Durham College). He first worked as a medical laboratory scientific officer in the Sunderland Group of hospitals, but has been involved with politics since 1987 when he became a District Councillor for Easington. He worked as a researcher for previous MP John Cummings since 1997, and was also Secretary of Easington Constituency Labour Party.

Parliamentary career
Morris was one of a handful of Labour MPs newly elected in 2010 considered to be on the left of the party politically. He was one of 16 signatories of an open letter to Ed Miliband in January 2015 calling on the party to commit to oppose further austerity, take rail franchises back into public ownership and strengthen collective bargaining arrangements.

In Parliament he was Parliamentary Private Secretary to Shadow Secretary of State for Energy and Climate Change, Meg Hillier and later to Shadow Chief Secretary to the Treasury Rachael Reeves. He served on the Health Select Committee.

Morris chairs the Labour Friends of Palestine & the Middle East. He presented the motion in Parliament calling on the government to formally recognise Palestinian statehood. He is Chair of the Unite Group in Parliament and is a champion of people with disabilities. He takes a close interest in animal welfare issues. Morris was one of 36 Labour MPs to nominate Jeremy Corbyn as a candidate in the Labour leadership election of 2015.

On 27 June 2016, Morris was appointed to the Shadow Cabinet as Shadow Secretary of State for Communities and Local Government and Shadow Minister for the Constitutional Convention.

On 22 April 2019, Morris retweeted a video supposedly about Palestinian children he had received and captioned it Israeli soldiers "caught on camera beating up Palestinian children for the fun of it." However, the video was actually of Guatemalan, not Israeli, soldiers.  Morris later apologised and said it was an "honest mistake". He referenced the dangers of fake news and said he would check sources with more care in future.

Personal life
He lives in Seaham, County Durham. He is a prominent supporter of Sunderland A.F.C.

He is married with two sons.

Notes

References

External links

|-

|-

1961 births
Labour Party (UK) MPs for English constituencies
Labour Friends of Palestine and the Middle East
Living people
People from Seaham
UK MPs 2010–2015
UK MPs 2015–2017
UK MPs 2017–2019
UK MPs 2019–present